These are the full results of the 2001 European Cup Super League in athletics which was held on 23 and 24 June 2001 at the Weserstadion in Bremen, Germany.

Team standings

Men's results

100 metres
23 JuneWind: +1.4 m/s

200 metres
24 JuneWind: -0.7 m/s

400 metres
23 June

800 metres
24 June

1500 metres
23 June

3000 metres
24 June

5000 metres
23 June

110 metres hurdles
24 JuneWind: +1.3 m/s

400 metres hurdles
23 June

3000 metres steeplechase
24 June

4 × 100 metres relay
23 June

4 × 400 metres relay
24 June

High jump
23 June

Pole vault
24 June

Long jump
23 June

Triple jump
24 June

Shot put
23 June

Discus throw
24 June

Hammer throw
23 June

Javelin throw
24 June

Women's results

100 metres
23 JuneWind: +2.8 m/s

200 metres
24 JuneWind: +0.3 m/s

400 metres
23 June

800 metres
23 June

1500 metres
24 June

3000 metres
23 June

5000 metres
24 June

100 metres hurdles
24 JuneWind: +0.6 m/s

400 metres hurdles
23 June

4 × 100 metres relay
23 June

4 × 400 metres relay
24 June

High jump
24 June

Pole vault
23 June

Long jump
24 June

Triple jump
23 June

Shot put
24 June

Discus throw
23 June

Hammer throw
24 June

Javelin throw
23 June

References

European Cup Super League
European
2001 in German sport
International athletics competitions hosted by Germany
Sport in Bremen (city)